Tir, tir or TIR may refer to:
 The modern Persian name for the Zoroastrian god Tishtrya
 Tir (month), of the Iranian calendar
 Tir (god), of ancient Armenia
 Tabar, Iran, a village in North Khorasan Province
 Old English spelling of the Norse god Týr
Tir (demon), son of Iblis

Abbreviations
 Total internal reflection
 Tigrinya language, ISO 639 code
 Tirupati Airport, IATA code
 Translocated intimin receptor, used by E. coli
 TIR Convention, (Transports Internationaux Routiers, International Road Transport)
 Toll-Interleukin receptor
 Total indicator reading in metrology

Other
 Tir McDohl, in the video game Suikoden
 INS Tir, various ships of the Indian navy

See also
Tir Planitia, a large basin on Mercury 
Tír na nÓg, an Otherworld in Irish mythology